Jennine Detiveaux (née Duncan, born 12 November 1993) is an American rugby union player. She is a Winger for the United States and for Exeter Chiefs in the Premier 15s.

Rugby career
Detiveaux played college softball at East Tennessee State, she discovered rugby after moving to Seattle and playing for the Seattle Saracens.

Detiveaux made her international debut for the Eagles against England in November 2018. In July 2022, She was one of four Eagles who extended their contracts with Exeter Chiefs for a third season.

Detiveaux played in a warm-up match against Scotland ahead of the World Cup, the Eagles won the hard-fought match 21–17.

Detiveaux was selected in the Eagles squad for the 2021 Rugby World Cup in New Zealand. She was named in the starting line-up against Italy in their opening match. She scored a try against Japan to help the Eagles win their first match at the tournament.

References

External links 

 Eagles Profile

Living people
1993 births
Female rugby union players
American female rugby union players
United States women's international rugby union players